A referendum on the terms of integration into the Federation of Malaysia was held in Singapore on 1 September 1962.

Option A, which provided for the highest level of autonomy, was the option selected on nearly 96% of valid ballots. However, 26% of voters cast blank or invalid ballots (mostly the former), meaning that Option A was only selected by 71% of those who participated in the referendum, or by 64% of registered voters.

Background
The first internal challenge to merger with the Federation of Malaya came from and grew out of a political struggle between the People's Action Party (PAP) and their opponents included the Barisan Sosialis (Socialist Front), the Liberal-Socialist Party, the Workers' Party, the United People's Party and the Partai Rakyat (People's Party).

In Singapore, the PAP sought formation of Malaysia on the basis of the strong mandate it obtained during the general elections of 1959 when PAP won 43 of the 51 seats. However, this mandate became questionable when dissension within the party led to a split. In July 1961, following a debate on a vote of confidence in the government, 13 PAP Assemblymen were expelled from the PAP for abstaining from voting. Subsequently, they formed a new political party, the Barisan Sosialis or the Barisan, reducing the PAP's majority in the Legislative Assembly to 26 of the 51 seats.

The ruling PAP was not legally obliged to call for a referendum, but did so to secure the mandate of the people. However, the Barisan Sosialis, a left-wing socialist party consisting of former PAP members with communist sympathies pedigree to the opposition to the colonialism, and imperialism movements were alleged that the people did not support merger, but Lee Kuan Yew declared that people did.

The referendum did not have an option of objecting to the idea of merger because no one had legitimately raised the issue in the Legislative Assembly before then. However, the methods had been debatable. The referendum was therefore called to resolve the issue as an effort to decide objectively which option the people backed. The legitimacy of the referendum was often challenged by Singaporean left-wingers, due to the lack of an option to vote against the merger.

Council of Joint Action 
The Council of Joint Action (CJA) founded by 19 members of the Assembly to block the merger and scuttle the referendum by taking the issue before the UN Committee on Colonialism. On 6 July 1962, The CJA signed a memorandum condemning the referendum on the grounds that the proposed constitutional changes and to assure its continued right to bases in Singapore, and to protect its privileged economic position. The CJA also criticized the terms, and the lack of choice in the referendum. In the memorandum, The CJA concluded that the transfer of sovereignty would be contrary to the spirit and resolution of the United Nations General Assembly's Declaration on the Granting of Independence to Colonial Countries and Peoples.

Proposed

Campaign
Strongly against the referendum, the Barisan Sosialis called for a boycott of the referendum, telling supporters to submit blank votes in protest of the "rigged" referendum. Over 144,000 blank votes were cast, over a quarter of all votes. That move had been anticipated by the ruling PAP government, as seen by the insertion of a clause that stated that all blank would be counted as a vote for the option that wins the most votes if there was no outright majority or that blank votes would be counted as Option A.

The mass media campaign fielded by both sides was extremely heated, many of the leaders on both sides broadcast radio shows in several languages.

Results

Aftermath
Backed by the official mandate, the Agreement relating to Malaysia between the United Kingdom of Great Britain and Northern Ireland, Federation of Malaya, North Borneo, Sarawak and Singapore was signed on 9 July 1963.

Singapore entered into merger with Malaya on 16 September 1963, marking the birth of Malaysia. Singapore ceased to be a state of Malaysia on 9 August 1965 when it became an independent state.

See also 
 Proclamation of Malaysia
 Singapore in Malaysia
 Independence of Singapore Agreement 1965

References

Formation of Malaysia
1962 referendums
Referendums in Singapore
History of Malaysia
1962 in Singapore
1962 in international relations
Multiple-choice referendums